Strumyani (also transliterated Strumjani or Strumiani) is a village in southwestern Bulgaria, part of Blagoevgrad Province. It is the administrative centre of Strumyani Municipality, which lies in the southwestern part of Blagoevgrad Province.

Strumyani was founded as a railway station on the Sofia-Kulata line named Gara Ograzhden ("Ograzhden Station"). In 1970, it was merged with the village of Mikrevo to form Strumyani, but the two villages were later separated; however, Strumyani kept its present name. The name means "people of the Struma", as the river runs nearby.

Villages in Blagoevgrad Province